Virginia Golf Club is a golf course located in Brisbane, Australia. The Club boasts a 27-hole golf course and Clubhouse. In 2013 Virginia Golf Club celebrated its 85-year anniversary and underscored its place as one of Queensland's oldest and most time honoured courses. Two of its Club Champions from the 1970s would later win major championships – Greg Norman and Wayne Grady.

History

In 1928, the Chief Engineer for the Queensland Main Roads Commission, D.A. Crawford, designed a nine-hole golf course on public land at Virginia. Brothers Jack and Bert Roach were contracted to clear the area of unwanted trees, shrubs and heavy undergrowth. Their only tools were axes, shovels, a plough, and a horse and cart. Volunteers helped clear weeds and build the tees and greens. The course was playable by the end of October 1929 and was officially opened by the Lord Mayor of Brisbane, William Jolly on Saturday 6 December 1930.

A second nine-hole course was designed by D. A. Crawford and opened on Saturday 2 September 1933.

In December 1946, 15-year-old caddie, Leo Lofthouse, won the Courier Mail's Caddies' Cup at Virginia. Not only was his round of 71 a record for amateurs on the course, it was also a better score than any professional who played the course that year.

The Club acquired an additional 72 acres of freehold land for the sum of £7,250 in June 1959.  The land was purchased by Jim Wilson, a Club member, as it was felt that the original owner of the land would not sell directly to the Club.  Wilson took control of the land in April 1958 and subsequently transferred title to the Virginia Golf Club.

The new land was cleared during 1963 with Al Howard, a course architect from Sydney, and Norman Von Nida,  a three-time Australian Open champion, appointed to design a 27-hole layout.  The current clubhouse was opened by the Lord Mayor of Brisbane, Clem Jones, in September 1969 and the redesign of the course was fully complete by October 1970.  Aside from a few small changes to the third nine which were made in 1992, this layout is still used today.

Between 1980 and 1988, the Club converted its greens from couch grass to Tifgreen 328 Bermuda.  The grass was chosen because of its fairer putting surface and its long wearing qualities that could cope with a sub-tropical climate.

In 2012, Wayne Grady Golf Design was appointed to redesign the current layout.   These changes are expected to be made gradually over the next 20 years.

Notable members
 Wayne Grady
 Greg Norman
 Andrew Buckle

Scorecard

References

External links
 Official Website.
 Golf Queensland
 Virginia Golf Club

1929 establishments in Australia
Sports clubs established in 1929
Sports venues completed in 1929
Golf clubs and courses in Queensland
Sporting clubs in Brisbane
Sports venues in Brisbane
Virginia, Queensland